Prachy dělaj člověka is a Czech crime comedy film directed by Jiří Chlumský. It was released in 2006.

Cast
Tomáš Hanák
Michal Suchánek
Ondřej Vetchý
Zdeněk Podhůrský
Kateřina Průšová
Tomáš Krejčíř
Petra Pudová
Tomáš Löbl
Eva Decastelo
Marek Taclík
Marek Vašut
Anna Šišková
Jana Synková
Martin Sitta
Radim Fiala
Petr Vágner
Martin Havelka
Renata Visnerová-Prokopová
Robert Nebřenský
Jiří Maria Sieber
Gabriela Partyšová

References

External links
 

2006 films
2006 comedy films
2000s crime comedy films
Czech crime comedy films
2000s Czech films